Spirit Mountain Wilderness Area is a  wilderness area located in the Newberry Mountains in Clark County, Nevada,  northwest of Laughlin. Spirit Mountain lies within the area.  It is managed by the Bureau of Land Management and the National Park Service.

Most of the wilderness is located in the Lake Mead National Recreation Area.  The area is adjacent to both the Nellis Wash Wilderness Area and the Bridge Canyon Wilderness Area.
Ancient Native American petroglyphs abound in Grapevine Canyon, located just south of Spirit Mountain. Located within the Lake Mead National Recreation Area just west of the 67-mile-long Lake Mohave, Grapevine Canyon offers visitors the opportunity to see numerous abstract, anthropomorphic, and animal depictions pecked directly into the basalt rock near the mount of the canyon. A parking area with restrooms is provided and a about a half-mile walk through desert scrub is required to see the petroglyphs. Ranger-guided hikes are offered by National Park Service staff based at Katherine Landing, located on the east side of Lake Mohave 2 miles north of Bullhead City, Arizona, and accessed via Arizona Highway 95 and Highway 68.  

The area was in the homeland of the Yuman Indians.  Yuman and Mojave people believe all life began on this mountain, which is visible for miles from Bullhead City in Arizona, Needles in California, and  Laughlin, Cal-Nev-Ari, and Searchlight in Nevada. Descendants of the first Native Americans to reside in the area still live on the Fort Mojave Indian Reservation, located about 20 miles south of the Spirit Mountains Wilderness.

The United States Congress designated the Spirit Mountain Wilderness in 2002.

Notes

External links
Spirit Mountain Wilderness - NPS
Spirit Mountain Wilderness Fact Sheet - BLM

Archaeological sites in Nevada
Protected areas of Nevada
Protected areas of the Mojave Desert
Protected areas of Clark County, Nevada
Bureau of Land Management areas in Nevada
National Park Service areas in Nevada
Lake Mead National Recreation Area